Zheng Quanshui (born March 1961) is a Chinese scientist currently serving as a professor and doctoral supervisor at Tsinghua University.

Education
He holds a number of degrees starting with bachelor's degree in Industrial and civil buildings from Jiangxi Institute of Technology (now Nanchang University, 1982), then a master's degree in applied mathematics from Beijing University (1985), a master's degree in solid mechanics from Hunan University (1985), and a doctor's degree from Tsinghua University (1989).

Career
From 1982 to 1993 he taught at Jiangxi Institute of Technology, becoming associate professor in 1987 and to full professor in 1992. From 1990 to 1993, he was a researcher at the Royal Society and Alexander von Humboldt Foundation. In May 1993 he joined the faculty of Institute of Aeronautics and Astronautics, Tsinghua University, where he became a doctoral supervisor in 1994 and a director of the Department of Engineering Mechanics in 2004,

Honours and awards
 1995 National Science Fund for Distinguished Young Scholars
 2000 "Chang Jiang Scholar" (or " Yangtze River Scholar")
 2004 State Natural Science Award (Second Class) 
 2017 State Natural Science Award (Second Class) 
 November 22, 2019 Member of the Chinese Academy of Sciences (CAS)

References

1961 births
Living people
People from Fuzhou, Jiangxi
Nanchang University alumni
Peking University alumni
Hunan University alumni
Tsinghua University alumni
Academic staff of Tsinghua University
Members of the Chinese Academy of Sciences
Engineers from Jiangxi
Scientists from Jiangxi
Educators from Jiangxi